In mathematics, the Kostant polynomials, named after Bertram Kostant, provide an explicit basis of the ring of polynomials over the ring of polynomials invariant under the finite reflection group of a root system.

Background
If the reflection group W corresponds to the Weyl group of a compact semisimple group K with maximal torus T, then the Kostant polynomials describe the structure of the de Rham cohomology of the generalized flag manifold K/T, also isomorphic to G/B where G is the complexification of K and B is the corresponding Borel subgroup. Armand Borel showed that its cohomology ring is isomorphic to the quotient of the ring of polynomials by the ideal generated by the invariant homogeneous polynomials of positive degree. This ring had already been considered by Claude Chevalley in establishing the foundations of the cohomology of compact Lie groups and their homogeneous spaces with André Weil, Jean-Louis Koszul and Henri Cartan; the existence of such a basis was used by Chevalley to prove that the ring of invariants was itself a polynomial ring. Their structure is governed by difference operators associated to the corresponding root system.

 defined an analogous basis when the polynomial ring is replaced by the ring of exponentials of the weight lattice. If K is simply connected, this ring can be identified with the representation ring R(T) and the W-invariant subring with R(K). Steinberg's basis was again motivated by a problem on the topology of homogeneous spaces; the basis arises in describing the T-equivariant K-theory of K/T.

Definition
Let Φ be a root system in a finite-dimensional real inner product space V with Weyl group W. Let Φ+ be a set of positive roots and Δ the corresponding set of simple roots. If α is a root, then sα denotes the corresponding reflection operator. Roots are regarded as linear polynomials on V using the inner product α(v) = (α,v). The choice of Δ gives rise to a Bruhat order on the Weyl group 
determined by the ways of writing elements minimally as products of simple root reflection. The minimal length for an element s is denoted
. Pick an element v in V such that α(v) > 0 for every positive root.

If αi is a simple root with reflection operator si

then the corresponding divided difference operator is defined by

If  and s has reduced expression

then

is independent of the reduced expression. Moreover

if  and 0 otherwise.

If w0 is the longest element of W, the element of greatest length or equivalently the element sending Φ+ to −Φ+, then

More generally

for some constants as,t.

Set

and

Then Ps is a homogeneous polynomial of degree .

These polynomials are the Kostant polynomials.

Properties
Theorem. The Kostant polynomials form a free basis of the ring of polynomials over the W-invariant polynomials.

In fact the matrix

is unitriangular for any total order such that s ≥ t implies .

Hence

Thus if

with as invariant under W, then

Thus

where

another unitriangular matrix with polynomial entries. 
It can be checked directly that as is invariant under W.

In fact δi satisfies the derivation property

Hence

Since

or 0, it follows that

so that by the invertibility of N

for all i, i.e. at is invariant under W.

Steinberg basis
As above let Φ be a root system in a real inner product space V, and Φ+ a subset of positive roots. From these data we obtain the subset Δ = {α1, α2, …, αn} of the simple roots, the coroots

and the fundamental weights λ1, λ2, ..., λn as the dual basis of the coroots.

For each element s in W, let Δs be the subset of Δ consisting of the simple roots satisfying s−1α < 0, and put

where the sum is calculated in the weight lattice P.

The set of linear combinations of the exponentials eμ with integer coefficients for μ in P becomes a ring over Z isomorphic to the group algebra of P, or equivalently to the representation ring
R(T) of T, where T is a maximal torus in K, the simply connected, connected compact semisimple Lie group with root system Φ. If W is the Weyl group of Φ, then the representation ring R(K) of K can be identified with R(T)W.

Steinberg's theorem. The exponentials λs (s in W) form a free basis for the ring of exponentials over the subring of W-invariant exponentials.

Let ρ denote the half sum of the positive roots, and A denote the antisymmetrisation operator

The positive roots β with sβ positive can be seen as a set of positive roots for a root system on a subspace of V; the roots are the ones orthogonal to s.λs. The corresponding Weyl group equals the stabilizer of λs in W. It is generated by the simple reflections sj for which sαj is a positive root.

Let M and N be the matrices

where ψs is given by the weight s−1ρ - λs. Then the matrix

is triangular with respect to any total order on W such that s ≥ t implies . 
Steinberg proved that the entries of B are W-invariant exponential sums. Moreover its diagonal entries all equal 1, so it has determinant 1. Hence its inverse C has the same form. Define

If χ is an arbitrary exponential sum, then it follows that

with as the W-invariant exponential sum

Indeed this is the unique solution of the system of equations

References

Invariant theory
Topology of homogeneous spaces
Algebraic groups